Cornelis van der Vliet (18 December 1880 – 16 December 1960) was a Dutch sports shooter. He competed in the team clay pigeon event at the 1920 Summer Olympics.

References

External links
 

1880 births
1960 deaths
Dutch male sport shooters
Olympic shooters of the Netherlands
Shooters at the 1920 Summer Olympics
People from Bloemendaal
Sportspeople from North Holland